Vauciennes may refer to the following places in France:

 Vauciennes, Marne, a commune in the Marne department
 Vauciennes, Oise, a commune in the Oise department